Mohamad bin Aziz (29 July 1940 – 24 December 2020) was the Member of the Parliament of Malaysia for the Sri Gading constituency in the state of Johor from 1999 to 2013. He sat in Parliament as a member of the United Malays National Organisation (UMNO) party in the governing Barisan Nasional coalition.

From 1981 to 1986 Mohamad served as an assistant to Hussein Onn, a former Prime Minister of Malaysia. Mohamad was a member of the Executive Council (akin to a State Cabinet) of Johor from 1990 to 1995 and the Johor State Government Information Chief from 1995 to 1999. In 1999 he was elected to Parliament for the Sri Gading constituency.

Mohamad caused controversy in 2009 when he called for two ministers in his Barisan Nasional government to resign. In June 2012, he called in Parliament for the execution for treason of the electoral reform activist Ambiga Sreenevasan.

His parliamentary career ended in 2013, when UMNO selected another candidate to contest the Sri Gading constituency. After the 2013 election, he was appointed as the Speaker of the Johor State Legislative Assembly.

He was also Umno Malaysia Deputy Permanent Chairman since 2008.

Death
Mohamad Aziz died on 24 December 2020 at the age of 80. He was laid to rest in the burial grounds at Bukit Aliff Muslim cemetery, Johor Bahru.

Election results

Honours

Honours of Malaysia
  :
  Medallist of the Order of the Defender of the Realm (PPN) (1976)
  Member of the Order of the Defender of the Realm (AMN) (1979)
  Officer of the Order of the Defender of the Realm (KMN) (1989)
  Commander of the Order of Meritorious Service (PJN) – Datuk (1996)
  Commander of the Order of Loyalty to the Crown of Malaysia (PSM) – Tan Sri (2014)
  :
  Second Class of the Sultan Ibrahim Medal (PIS II)
  Second Class of the Star of Sultan Ismail (BSI II)
  Companion of the Order of the Crown of Johor (SMJ) (1992)

References

1940 births
2020 deaths
People from Batu Pahat
People from Johor
Members of the Dewan Rakyat
Members of the Johor State Legislative Assembly
United Malays National Organisation politicians
Malaysian people of Malay descent
Speakers of the Johor State Legislative Assembly
Commanders of the Order of Loyalty to the Crown of Malaysia
Commanders of the Order of Meritorious Service
Companions of the Order of the Crown of Johor
Officers of the Order of the Defender of the Realm
Members of the Order of the Defender of the Realm
Medallists of the Order of the Defender of the Realm